Rama Varma XIII (died July 1851) was an Indian monarch who ruled the Kingdom of Cochin from 1844 to 1851.

Reign 
Rama Varma was a nephew of Rama Varma XII and ascended the throne on his death in June 1844. He was the son of Ekkavu Thampuran, the ancestor of the present head of the household.

Death 

Rama Varma XIII died in July 1851.

References 

 

1851 deaths
Rulers of Cochin
Year of birth missing